James Kushner (born 1968) is an American actor, principally known for having originated the role of Jason in the original off-Broadway production of the William Finn/James Lapine one-act musical March of the Falsettos.  He also appeared in the HBO production of Lapine's television drama Table Settings.

As of 2012, he resides in Florida with his wife and their two daughters.

References

American male stage actors
Living people
1968 births
Place of birth missing (living people)